Marendaz Special cars were made in Brixton Road, London SW9, England from 1926 to 1932 and in Maidenhead, Berkshire, England from 1932 to 1936.

DMK (Donald Marcus Kelway) Marendaz served as an apprentice at Siddeley-Deasy before the first World War. He left to join the Royal Flying Corps in 1916, training as a pilot and serving in France until invalided out in 1918 with the rank of lieutenant. After 1918, he joined Alvis, but was sacked, and shortly afterwards started Marseel with a Mr Seelhaft; the company manufactured gearboxes for the Emscote car. Emscote did not take all the gearboxes they made, so the surplus were used with Coventry-Simplex engines to make complete cars. The company changed its name to Marseal in 1923, when Seelhart left. Between 1920 and 1925, when Marseal failed, as many as 1200 cars might have been made in the Coventry factory.

After a brief period in the City of London, in 1926 the 'Captain' started DMK Marendaz Ltd in the premises of the London Cab Company in Brixton, where the London agents for Bugatti and Graham-Paige were also based. The cars were attractive-looking with a Bentley-like radiator and mainly used Anzani engines. Model names were often confusingly complex with the 11/55, 14/55 and 14/125 also being called the -litre. A strange departure was the 1495 cc straight-eight which used a special Anzani crank and Marendaz designed block. Although catalogued in normal and supercharged form, it is thought not to have got past the prototype stage. Although supporting an ambitious racing programme, very few cars were made and it seems that the company's main income derived from tuning and servicing work and the sales of used sporting cars. Somewhere between 20 and 50 cars were made between 1926 and 1932. Captain Marendaz had an aversion to journalists and so exactly what happened in the factory is often a mystery.  He was also famous for threatening legal action against anyone who made remarks about his cars he did not agree with.

In 1932 the company was re-organised as Marendaz Special Cars Ltd and moved to Cornwallis Works, Maidenhead where GWK and Burney cars had also been made. The cars at first used American Continental engines with Marendaz cylinder heads and manifolding but later were probably completely built by Marendaz as he redesigned the block. The gearboxes might also have been Marendaz designed, but some by Moss were used. Sales were again supported by a considerable racing programme including entries by Captain Marendaz himself up to 1931 and his secretary Miss Dorothy Summers up to 1936. They were also raced by Mr and Mrs AE Moss, the parents of Sir Stirling Moss.

Production seems to have ceased in 1936 but possibly a few cars were made in 1937. Estimates of production range from about 80 to 120 cars in total, including those from Brixton. Survivors from the Brixton days are rare but several 13/70 and 15/80 range still exist.

The Captain went on to set up Marendaz Aircraft Ltd in 1936 to build aircraft, but produced only prototypes. He was also a supporter of Oswald Mosley, leader of the British Union of Fascists and this led in 1940 to him being jailed on security charges. He was released after a few days. After the war, he emigrated to South Africa where he built small diesel engines. He returned to England in 1972 and died in 1988 at the age of 91.

Models

See also 
 List of car manufacturers of the United Kingdom

References
Beaulieu Encyclopedia of the Automobile. Editor Nick Georgano. The Stationery Office, 2000. 
A-Z of Cars of the 1930s. Michael Sedwick and Mark Gillies. Bay View Books 1989. 

Defunct motor vehicle manufacturers of England
Motor vehicle manufacturers based in London
Companies based in Maidenhead